The 2014 Australian human powered vehicle season began on the 28 February with the first round of the Victorian HPV Series at Casey Fields and concludes with the RACV Energy Breakthrough series at Maryborough, Victoria.

Australia is the world leader in Human powered vehicle (Velomobile) racing.

Season Calendar

References 

2014 in Australian sport
Cycle racing in Australia
Hum